Herbert Thorson Blomstedt (born 11 July 1927) is a Swedish conductor.

Herbert Blomstedt was born in Springfield, Massachusetts, the son of Adolf Blomstedt (1898–1981) and his wife Alida Armintha Thorson (1899–1957). Two years after his birth, his Swedish parents moved the family back to their country of origin. He studied at the Stockholm Royal College of Music and the University of Uppsala, followed by studies of contemporary music at Darmstadt in 1949, Baroque music with Paul Sacher at the Schola Cantorum Basiliensis, and further conducting studies with Igor Markevitch, Jean Morel at the Juilliard School, and Leonard Bernstein at Tanglewood's Berkshire Music Center. Blomstedt also lived in Finland during his youth.

He won the Koussevitzky Conducting Prize in 1953 and the Salzburg Conducting Competition in 1955.

Blomstedt is most noted for his performances of German and Austrian composers, such as Beethoven, Felix Mendelssohn, Johannes Brahms, Franz Schubert, Anton Bruckner, Richard Strauss and Paul Hindemith, and also as a champion of Scandinavian composers, such as Edvard Grieg, Franz Berwald, Jean Sibelius and Carl Nielsen.

A devout Seventh-day Adventist, Blomstedt does not rehearse on Friday nights or Saturdays, the Sabbath in Seventh-day Adventism. He does, however, conduct concerts, since he considers actual performances to be an expression of his religious devotion rather than work.

He has been Music Director or Principal Conductor of the Norrköping Symphony Orchestra (1954–1962), Oslo Philharmonic Orchestra (1962–1968), Danish Radio Symphony (1967–1977) and Swedish Radio Symphony (1977–1982). From 1975 to 1985, he served as chief conductor of the Dresdner Staatskapelle, in the process making many well-regarded recordings, including works of Richard Strauss and the complete Beethoven and Schubert symphonies, and leading the orchestra on international tours.

Blomstedt was music director of the San Francisco Symphony from 1985 to 1995.  He led the orchestra on regular tours of Europe and Asia, and made numerous prize-winning recordings for London/Decca, winning two Grammy Awards, a Gramophone Award and a Grand Prix du Disque, as well as awards from Belgium, Germany and Japan.  After leaving San Francisco full-time, Blomstedt held principal conductorships with the North German Radio Symphony (1996–1998) and Leipzig Gewandhaus Orchestra (1998–2005).

Blomstedt is currently Conductor Laureate of the San Francisco Symphony and Honorary Conductor of the Bamberg Symphony, Danish National Symphony Orchestra, NHK Symphony, Swedish Radio Symphony, Leipzig Gewandhaus Orchestra and Staatskapelle Dresden.

Awards
 2022 Knight Commander's Cross of the Order of Merit of the Federal Republic of Germany

References

External links

 Herbert Blomstedt biography at the San Francisco Symphony
 Herbert Blomstedt – a perspective as of 1998 (includes discography, quotes and concert schedules)
 Bamberg Symphony Honorary Conductor
 Danish Radio Symphony Honorary Conductor
 NHK Symphony Honorary Conductor
 Swedish Radio Symphony Honorary Conductor
 CAMI Artist Page
 DECCA Artist Page
PENTATONE Artist Page
 Interview with Herbert Blomstedt, 8 January 1988

1927 births
Living people
Swedish conductors (music)
Male conductors (music)
Uppsala University alumni
Grammy Award winners
Royal College of Music, Stockholm alumni
Swedish Seventh-day Adventists
New England Conservatory alumni
Knights Commander of the Order of Merit of the Federal Republic of Germany
Knights of the Order of the Dannebrog
Recipients of the Léonie Sonning Music Prize
Swedish expatriates in the United States
Classical musicians from Massachusetts
20th-century Swedish male musicians
20th-century Swedish musicians